Seagate bus station serves the city of Dundee, Scotland. It has nine stances.

Located five minutes' walk from the city centre, it has bus links to many Scottish towns and cities as well as links to London and other major cities

The bus station is located about 100 metres to the east of the site of the 1906 Dundee fire.

The X7 Coastrider service between Perth and Aberdeen calls here.

History
The station was opened in 1958, replacing W. Alexander & Sons' bus station on Lindsay Street and South Ward Road.

References

Bus stations in Scotland
Transport in Dundee